Phanerochaete burtii is a species of fungus in the family Phanerochaetaceae. It is a plant pathogen that infects plane trees.

References

Fungal tree pathogens and diseases
burtii
Fungi described in 1926